is a passenger railway station  located in the town of Iwami, Iwami District, Tottori Prefecture, Japan. It is operated by the West Japan Railway Company (JR West).

Lines

Station layout
The station consists of one ground-level side platform connected by a footbridge to a ground level island platform.  The station is unattended.

Platforms

Adjacent stations

History
At the end of the Meiji era, the San'in Main Line was extended from the west and Tottori Station opened in 1908. After that, a route heading east along the coastline was planned, but Iwai Village petitioned for a route that would follow the old San'in Highway, pass through Iwai Onsen, and pass through the mountains to Tajima. There was a battle between the mountain route recommended by Iwai Village and the seaside route recommended by Uradome Village, Hamasaka, and Toyooka, but due to the opposition of the farmers near Iwai and the cost of building the sea side route being cheaper, it was decided to build a staton at the midpoint between Uradome Village and Iwai Village, about 4 kilometers in a straight line from the hot spring area. There was also a dispute between Iwai Village and Uradome Village over the name of the station, and Prime Minister Taro Katsura decided to name it Iwami Station.

The station opened on June 10, 1910.  With the privatization of the Japan National Railways (JNR) on April 1, 1987, the station came under the aegis of the West Japan Railway Company.

Passenger statistics
In fiscal 2018, the station was used by an average of 772 passengers daily.

Surrounding area
Iwami Town Hall
Tottori Prefectural Iwami High School
Iwami Town Iwami Junior High School
Healthy Center Iwami Hospital
Iwami Town Tourist Information Center

See also
List of railway stations in Japan

References

External links 

 Iwami Station from JR-Odekake.net 

Railway stations in Tottori Prefecture
Sanin Main Line
Railway stations in Japan opened in 1910
Iwami, Tottori